Di tanto in tanto is a compilation album released by Mina in 1978. All tracks have previously been published on various albums.

Track listing

Credits
Mina – vocals
Pino Presti – arranger/conductor 
Gianni Ferrio – arranger/conductor in "Laia ladaia (Reza)"
Natale Massara – arranger/conductor in "Ballata d'autunno (Balada de otono)"
Nuccio Rinaldis – sound engineer

References

Mina (Italian singer) compilation albums
1978 compilation albums
Italian-language albums
Albums conducted by Pino Presti
Albums arranged by Pino Presti